Live in Rotterdam is a Roller Trio album recorded live at the 2014 EBU European Jazz Competition finals in Rotterdam. It was broadcast on Jazz on 3 (BBC Radio 3).

One week before the performance, saxophonist James Mainwaring broke a bone in his right hand, making the band unable to play their planned set. In one week they wrote a new half hour set of material for one handed sax. Mainwaring also used effects pedals.

Track list

References

Roller Trio albums
Live jazz albums
2014 live albums